Showroom, stylized as SHOWROOM, is a Japanese live streaming service used primarily for Japanese idols and voice actors. A development of DeNA, it has been integrated into the audition process for idol groups such as 22/7, Nogizaka46, and Keyakizaka46.
 
App analytics company App Annie announced on September 13, 2017, that for the first half of 2017, in terms of revenue, SHOWROOM is Japan's top-ranked video distribution application.

Events 
The service is used for daily live-streams which may be viewed for free. As of March 2018, there are no paid or subscription-based memberships. Revenue is generated from paid virtual gift items given to the performer by registered members during live-streams.  Earnings are shared with the performers based upon the number of points they accumulate based on audience size, the number of comments, and other factors,  and production companies may offer licensing deals or other music offers.

Initially, it only allowed streaming by the DeNA headquarters studio and by officially-recognized entertainers. After September 13, 2014, any registered member could live-stream. English language support was also added.

History 
 November 25, 2013 - Browser-based service initiated by DeNA Corporation
 December 20, 2013 - Android app launched
 January 14, 2014 - iOS app launched
 June 10, 2014 - Added the free gift system given as a bonus for watching streams
 September 13, 2014 - All registered members are allowed to live-stream, English support added.
 October 1, 2014 - 10-minute additional usage limit for amateur dedicated gift items and paid gifts raised to 10000 gold
 January 9, 2015 - Free release of official dedicated streaming software "SHOWROOM Producer" 
 February 9, 2015 - Added a 25-character maximum chyron function displayed at the top of the video
 April 1, 2015 - Released an iOS-version of "SHOWROOM Producer" 
 May 18, 2015 - Limit raised for maximum amount of free gift items 
 May 2015 - Viewing fees charged for some official content (Yokohama DeNA BayStars game live-stream, etc.)
 August 3, 2015 - DeNA Corporation spins off SHOWROOM Co., Ltd. to operate the service.
 October 22, 2020 - Launched the smash. video streaming app.

References

External links
 SHOWROOM Home Page

Android (operating system) software
Japanese entertainment websites
Internet properties established in 2013
IOS software
Multilingual websites
DeNA
Live streaming services
2013 establishments in Japan
Internet technology companies of Japan